The Gympie Arterial Road is a freeway in the northern suburbs of Brisbane in Queensland, Australia.  The road starts in Carseldine at Gympie Road and terminates at the Gateway Motorway where it becomes the Bruce Highway. 
It is three lanes in each direction from Carseldine to the Strathpine Road intersection, and two lanes to the Gateway Motorway. 

In 2000, a lane duplication was completed and an exit lane was closed at the Strathpine Road off-ramp, with 2 new lanes opened along with traffic lights in its place.

Upgrades

Strathpine Road intersection
A project to improve the intersection with Strathpine Road, at a cost of $30 million, was under construction in April 2022.

Linkfield Road intersection
A project to upgrade the Linkfield Road intersection, at a cost of $125 million, was starting the design stage early in 2022.

Major intersections
The entire road is in the Brisbane local government area.

See also

 Freeways in Australia
 Freeways in Brisbane

References

Roads in Queensland